The Magic 7 is an animated television film written and directed by Roger Holzberg. It was slated to air on Earth Day (April 22) in 1997, but was postponed. After later plans for a 2005 release, the film was again suspended.

Plot
The film centers on the adventures of two children and a dragon as they fight the arch-enemies of Earth.

Cast
 John Candy as Smokestack Sam
 Madeline Kahn as Wastra
 Michael J. Fox as Marcel Maggot
 Cory Danziger as Sean
 Dee Wallace as Sean's mom
 Ted Danson as Sean's dad
 Ice-T as Dr. Scratch
 Jeremy Irons as Thraxx
 Demi Moore as U-Z-Onesa
 James Earl Jones as 5-Toe

Production
Production on the film began in 1990 and has been repeatedly delayed. Subsequently, two of the actors who recorded voices for the parts in the film are now deceased: John Candy, the voice of Smokestack Sam, died in 1994; Madeline Kahn, the voice of Wastra, died in 1999. Other actors, such as Michael J. Fox, James Earl Jones, Jeremy Irons, Ice-T and Dirk Benedict, all recorded their voices in the early 1990s.  Kevin Bacon, Bette Midler, and Judy Collins appear as themselves.

Pulse Entertainment and Distribution, under the direction of CEO Ron Layton, bought the grand rights to The Magic 7 in 1995 with the intention of fully producing the animation. Songwriter Robert J. Sherman was hired to write additional songs for the film. Sherman also wrote a treatment using the already recorded voices in a revised script. However, insufficient funds were raised, and the project was eventually shelved until the early 2000s, when interest was reignited in it.

References

External links

American television films
Musicals by Robert J. Sherman
Unfinished animated films
1990s unfinished films
2000s unfinished films
2000s English-language films
1990s English-language films